This is a discography of records (primarily albums) produced, engineered, and/or mixed by Glyn Johns for various acts.  Though Johns is best known for his work as an engineer and producer for other artists, he recorded several singles as a solo act in the 1960s.  At the end of this article, there is a brief section devoted to Johns' work as a solo artist.

Albums (as producer, recording engineer, and/or mixing engineer)

All information presented in this section, unless otherwise indicated, is taken from the discography compiled by Andrew Alburn on pp. 291–300 in Glyn Johns' autobiography, Sound Man, and "Glyn Johns Credits" (AllMusic).

Discography as a solo artist
In the 1960s Johns recorded several singles as a solo artist.  The information in this section is taken from Johns' autobiography and from 45Cat.  Johns did not produce or engineer any of his solo records.

Notes

References

Bibliography

Johns, Glyn